Bishwa Prakash Sharma is a Nepali politician. He is one of the two general secretaries of the Nepali Congress.

Political career 
Sharma was elected general secretary along with Gagan Thapa in the 14th general convention of Nepali Congress. This was termed as rise of new generation in the oldest party of Nepal, the Nepali Congress.

Sharma has served as spokesperson of the party. He has also served as the national president of the Nepal Student Union (NSU).

In the 2022 Nepalese general election, he was elected as the member of the 2nd Federal Parliament of Nepal.

References

External links 

Bishwa Prakash Sharma on Twitter
Bishwa Prakash Sharma on Facebook

Living people
Nepali Congress politicians from Koshi Province
21st-century Nepalese politicians
1970 births
People from Jhapa District
Nepal MPs 2022–present